Margarete Balk (4 February 1896 – 10 July 1974) was a German teacher and politician. She was a member of the Landtag of Bavaria from 1958 to 1966.

Balk completed a teacher training in Gemünden and Aschaffenburg in 1918. Then she headed from 1921 to 1940 various children's homes and schools, among other things, on the Heuberg at Sigmaringen. From 1940 to 1945 she was a teacher at the Agricultural Vocational School of Charles city, after the Second World War from 1945 to 1948 she taught at the elementary school in Karlburg.

References

1896 births
1974 deaths
People from Main-Spessart
Women members of State Parliaments in Germany
Members of the Landtag of Bavaria
Christian Social Union in Bavaria politicians
20th-century German women politicians
20th-century German politicians
German schoolteachers